Graham Witney (21 April 1934 – 8 February 2008) was a South African cricketer. He played in two first-class matches for Border in 1954/55.

See also
 List of Border representative cricketers

References

External links
 

1934 births
2008 deaths
South African cricketers
Border cricketers
Cricketers from Cape Town